The men's marathon event at the 1983 Summer Universiade was held in Edmonton, Canada on 9 July 1983.

Results

References

Athletics at the 1983 Summer Universiade
1983